Diane Gordon is an American politician and a former member of the New York State Assembly who represented the East New York section of Brooklyn from 2001 to 2008.

Political background
On July 10, 2006, Gordon was indicted by the office of the Brooklyn District Attorney, who filed charges alleging that the assemblywoman offered to help a contractor obtain a $2 million parcel of land from the city if he would build her a house. On April 8, 2008, she was convicted on eight of nine counts, including: Two counts of receiving bribes, two counts of official misconduct and two counts of "receiving awards for official misconduct" and automatically vacated her Assembly seat. On January 21, 2009, after six months of appeals, she began serving her two-to-six year jail term.

Family
Diane Gordon has three children named Misha, Mireille, and Helen with one child who is deceased.

Residence
Diane Gordon was born in Hemingway, South Carolina, and her home city is in Brooklyn, New York.

Education
Diane Gordon received her education from the following institutions:
BA, Business Administration, New York City Technical College, 1985
Certified, Business Mathematics, American Business Institute
Graduated, True Worship Bible Ministry School

Organizations
Diane Gordon has been a member of the following organizations:
Vice-President, Women Mentoring Ministry, True Worship Church, present
Evangelist, True Worship Church, 1985–present
Founder, Save Our Homes Organization of East New York, 1985
Founder, Coalition of Clergymen, East New York Community

References

Living people
Politicians from Brooklyn
African-American state legislators in New York (state)
African-American women in politics
Democratic Party members of the New York State Assembly
Women state legislators in New York (state)
American politicians convicted of bribery
New York (state) politicians convicted of crimes
People from Hemingway, South Carolina
Year of birth missing (living people)
21st-century African-American people
21st-century African-American women